Nalbant is a commune in Tulcea County, Northern Dobruja, Romania. It is composed of three villages: Nalbant, Nicolae Bălcescu (since 1948; until 1923 Bașchioi; Principele Mihai from 1923 to 1948) and Trestenic.

The commune's name comes from Turkish, nalbant from Persian nal-band meaning blacksmith (nal – nail, horse shoe, band – to bond, to tie).

References

Communes in Tulcea County
Localities in Northern Dobruja
Place names of Turkish origin in Romania